There are important differences between a homeowner association (HOA) and a civic association.

General comparison
The following table compares HOAs and civic associations for a selection of topics.

Neighborhood associations
Community development
Community organizations